Nicos Katsourides (born 14 December 1951) is a Cypriot politician. He studied Economics (PhD in Bulgaria) in the field of Planning and Administration of the National  Economy. He speaks Greek, English and Bulgarian. Katsourides has been a member of Cypriot parliament since 1991 for the constituency of Nicosia under the banner of AKEL and a parliamentary spokesman for his party since 2003. He was a member of the Political Bureau of the Central Committee of AKEL until December 2013 and head of the party's Committee for the Study for the Cyprus Problem until January 2014. He was also a member of the National Council, the supreme advisory body to the President of the Republic for the Cyprus problem, until January 2014.

References 

Members of the House of Representatives (Cyprus)
Progressive Party of Working People politicians
1951 births
Living people
People from Nicosia